Yaasmeen Bedart-Ghani (born 8 November 1996) is an American volleyball player who has played in Europe and Asia.

She currently plays for Suwon Hyundai Hillstate in the Korean V-League.

References

External links
  at Volleybox

1997 births
Living people
American women's volleyball players
21st-century American women
Texas Longhorns women's volleyball players